Golden Fresh Land is a newspaper published in Burma. Due to law changes, the paper began freely publishing from 1 April 2013.  Golden Fresh Land is run by Khin Maung Lay who worked for the Mogyo Daily prior to 1964 and has served multiple prison terms for speaking out against the government.

References

Daily newspapers published in Myanmar